"Sing Me to Sleep" is a song by Norwegian record producer and DJ Alan Walker. Incorporating uncredited vocals provided by Norwegian singer Iselin Solheim, (who previously provided uncredited vocals on Walker's song Faded) it was released commercially for digital consumption on 3 June 2016. Upon release, the song received positive reviews from music critics, with several positively comparing it to Alan's previous song "Faded".

Music video
The release of the music video for "Sing Me to Sleep" was published on Walker's YouTube channel on 2 June 2016.

An accompanying music video for the single was shot in Hong Kong. The video shows the young man from the music video of "Faded", as well as another man and a woman, walking and running in the city of Hong Kong. Throughout the video, the camera filter transitions from normal to thermal sensor, with some buildings and pedestrians occasionally glitching as though from the viewer's point of view. At the end, the three characters meet up inside a warehouse in an industrial building, where they assemble some sort of machine together, which projects glowing blue lines throughout the city of Hong Kong, as the video glitches and ends.

Track listing

Charts and certifications

Weekly charts

Year-end charts

Certifications

Release history

References

Songs about sleep
2016 songs
Number-one singles in Norway
Songs written by Alan Walker (music producer)
Songs written by Jesper Borgen
Songs written by Gunnar Greve
Alan Walker (music producer) songs
Songs written by Mood Melodies